Bernard White (born June 8, 1959) is an American actor, screenwriter and film director.

Personal life

Born in Colombo, Ceylon and raised in Detroit, Michigan, White earned his bachelor's degree in theatre at Michigan State University.

White's paternal grandparents were John Bernard White and Mary Cecilia Hawke. Both were of partial Tamil ancestry.
White's maternal grandparents were Harry Wickramasekera and Maude Robinson.

Marriages
Bernard White previously was married to actress Julia Campbell and currently is married to actress Jackie Katzman. He is best known as "Denpok" on Silicon Valley (2014–20).

Filmography

References

External links
 

1959 births
Living people
American male film actors
American film directors
American male screenwriters
American male television actors
American theatre managers and producers
American male voice actors
Michigan State University alumni
Male actors from Detroit
People from Colombo
Screenwriters from Michigan
Sri Lankan male film actors
Sri Lankan film directors
Sri Lankan screenwriters
Sri Lankan male television actors
Sri Lankan voice actors